Ethiopia and Indonesia established diplomatic relations in 1961, followed by the opening of Indonesian embassy in Addis Ababa in 1964. Indonesia have an embassy in Addis Ababa that also accredited to Somalia and Djibouti, while Ethiopia has established a new embassy in Jakarta in the second half 2016. H.E. Arega Hailu Teffera, Ambassador Extraordinary and Plenipotentiary of the Federal Democratic Republic of Ethiopia has presented his credential to H.E. President Joko Widodo on 23 February 2017. The Ethiopian embassy is now fully functional in Jakarta. The Embassy of Ethiopia in Jakarta is accredited to ASEAN HQ, Malaysia, Singapore, Cambodia, Maldives and Pakistan. Both nations are members of  the Non-Aligned Movement.

Indonesian embassy in Ethiopia has identified two main obstacles that hamper the trade relations between the two nations; the geographic location of Ethiopia as a landlocked country and the armed conflicts around Ethiopia. Through Non-Aligned Movement Center for South-South Technical Cooperation, Indonesia has assisted numbers of Ethiopian public officials through education and training in Indonesia encompassing various sectors; such as agriculture, education, family planning, micro-enterprise management, environment, poverty reduction, health improvement and higher education opportunities.

Trade and investment
Although today the trade volume is relatively small, the trade between Ethiopia and Indonesia are potentially to be increased as Indonesia saw Ethiopia as a new African market for Indonesian products, such as soap and instant noodle. In 2007 the bilateral trade volume stood around US$69 million, with trade balance heavily in favour to Indonesia. Ethiopian imports from Indonesia are electronics, soap and detergent, paper and books, tire, textile and furniture.

Notes

See also 
 Foreign relations of Ethiopia
 Foreign relations of Indonesia

References
https://web.archive.org/web/20150402194355/http://www.kemlu.go.id/addisababa/Pages/CountryProfile.aspx?l=en

External links
Embassy of Indonesia in Addis Ababa - Ethiopia

Indonesia
Bilateral relations of Indonesia